The Beginning of Survival is the first in a series of compilation albums by Canadian singer-songwriter Joni Mitchell, released by Geffen Records in 2004. The songs were taken from her albums Dog Eat Dog (6 tracks), Chalk Mark in a Rainstorm (4), Night Ride Home (3), Turbulent Indigo (2), and Taming the Tiger (1).

Track listing
All songs by Joni Mitchell unless otherwise noted
 "The Reoccurring Dream" – 3:03
 "The Windfall (Everything for Nothing)" – 5:09
 "Slouching Towards Bethlehem" – 6:49
 "Dog Eat Dog" – 4:27
 "Fiction" (Mitchell, Larry Klein) – 4:10
 "The Beat of Black Wings" – 5:22
 "No Apologies" – 4:17
 "Sex Kills" – 3:56
 "The Three Great Stimulants" – 6:06
 "Lakota" (Mitchell, Klein) –  6:25
 "Ethiopia" – 5:38
 "Cool Water" (Bob Nolan) –  5:25
 "Tax Free" (Mitchell, Klein) –  4:17
 "The Magdalene Laundries" – 4:01
 "Passion Play" – 5:19
 "Impossible Dreamer" – 4:30

References

Joni Mitchell compilation albums
2004 compilation albums
Geffen Records compilation albums